Humberto Cuitláhuac Rubalcaba Zuleta (born October 29, 1943) is a Mexican attorney and former Mexican rock music impresario. He gained international recognition as the publisher of the book "Nosotros", the awarded short film "Tinta Blanca en Avandaro" as well as for being the defense attorney of the band Tinta Blanca during its protest outside Los Pinos when then President Echeverria decided to tackle La Onda movement after the Avandaro festival;  however, his support to the counterculture was heavily used against him in future cases such as the arrest of the high-profile Interpol officer Aldana Ibarra.

In 1997, he was awarded with the prestigious "Medalla al Mérito" by then president Ernesto Zedillo.

He is an active member of the Academia Mexicana de Jurisprudencia y Legislacion (Mexican Academy of Jurisprudence and Legislation), of the Consejo Nacional de la Abogacia (National Advocacy Council) and former president of Asociación Mexicana de Abogados (Mexican Association of Lawyers).

Literary works 
NOSOTROS. Published by Editorial Nosotros, Mexico 1972.
La modernización del sistema judicial en México. Published by Editorial Progreso, Mexico 1993.

Film work 
Tinta Blanca en Avandaro. Produced by Peliculas Candiani S.A., Mexico, 1971. Awarded the "Sombrero de Bronce" at the Guadalajara IVth International Short Film Festival, 1972.

References

Further reading 
 Agustin, José (2013). Tragicomedia Mexicana Vol. 2. Debolsillo. Mexico ASIN B00DUGYL4M.
 Zolov, Eric (1999). Refried Elvis: The rise of the Mexican counterculture. University of California Press, USA .
 Pacini, Deborah (2004). Rockin' Las Americas: The global politics of rock in Latin America. University of Pittsburgh Press, USA .
 Rodríguez O., Jaime; Kathryn Vincent (1997). Common Border, Uncommon Paths: Race, Culture, and National Identity in U.S.-Mexican Relations. Rowman & Littlefield, USA .

External links 
NOSOTROS book available for fair-use.
Humberto Rubalcaba's Web entry.
Tinta Blanca en Avandaro. The shortfilm, available for fair-use, no sound and with watermark.

1943 births
Living people
Rock festivals in Mexico
Hippies
Counterculture festivals
Counterculture
Impresarios
National Autonomous University of Mexico alumni